Rajesh Faldessai (born 1976/77) is an Indian politician and mining businessperson from Goa. He is the current member of the Goa Legislative Assembly representing the Cumbarjua Assembly constituency. He contested on Indian National Congress ticket in the 2022 Goa Legislative Assembly election and emerged victorious. Faldessai defeated Janita Pandurang Madkaikar wife of politician, Pandurang Madkaikar of the Bharatiya Janata Party by a margin of 2827 votes.

Early life and education 
Rajesh Faldessai was born to Kushali Faldessai in Goa. He completed his Higher Secondary School Certificate in Arts from Council of Open Schooling, Haryana in 2014. He currently resides in Quepem, Goa, India.

References

1970s births
Year of birth uncertain
Goa MLAs 2022–2027
21st-century Indian politicians
Living people
Bharatiya Janata Party politicians from Goa
Former members of Indian National Congress from Goa